The King's Gift is the fifteenth studio album, and the first Christmas album released in 2013 by American country music artist Trace Adkins. It is his first album of Christmas music and an album of classic Christmas Carols performed in Celtic style.

Track listing

Personnel
Wayne Addleman - Weissenborn
Trace Adkins - lead vocals
Kenny Aronoff - drums on "Carol of the Drum"
Spady Brannen - bass guitar
Steve Brewster - drums, percussion
Skip Cleavinger - tin whistle, uillean pipes
Jon Coleman - Hammond B-3 organ, keyboards, piano, synthesizer pads, background vocals
Kevin Conoff - bodhrán on "I Saw Three Ships"
Kevin Costner - vocals on "Silent Night"
Lily Costner - vocals on "Silent Night"
Mark Gillespie - mandolin
David Goodman - irish whistle, small pipes
Becky Issacs - vocals on "Oh Holy Night"
Ben Isaacs - vocals on "Oh Holy Night "
Sonya Isaacs - vocals on "We Three Kings"
Steve Mackey - bass guitar
Paddy Moloney - penny whistle and uillean pipes on "I Saw Three Ships"
Triona Marshall - harp
Alyth McCormack - vocals on "I Saw Three Ships"
Jon Pilatzky - fiddle
Paul Reissner - background vocals
Deannie Richardson - percussion
Perry Richardson - background vocals
Michael Spriggs - bouzouki, baritone guitar, nylon string guitar
Emma Stevens - vocals on "O' Come Emmanuel" and "Away in a Manger"
Jeff White - acoustic guitar
Brian Wooten - electric guitar
Jonathan Yudkin - cello, Irish harp, mandolin, violin

Chart performance

References

2013 Christmas albums
Trace Adkins albums
Christmas albums by American artists
Country Christmas albums
Celtic Christmas albums